Lochmaeocles batesi is a species of beetle in the family Cerambycidae. It was described by Per Olof Christopher Aurivillius in 1923. It is known from Ecuador, Costa Rica, Guatemala, Nicaragua, Honduras, Mexico, Colombia, and Panama.

References

batesi
Beetles described in 1923